Ermington was an electoral district for the Legislative Assembly in the Australian State of New South Wales from 1991 to 1999, named after the suburb of Ermington. Its only member was Michael Photios, representing the Liberal Party.

Members for Ermington

Election results

References

Former electoral districts of New South Wales
Constituencies established in 1991
1991 establishments in Australia
Constituencies disestablished in 1999
1999 disestablishments in Australia